Hidden Agenda is an American hidden camera game show hosted by comedian Debi Gutierrez. The series premiered on Game Show Network (GSN) on January 14, 2010, airing new episodes once a week for seven weeks. The show uses with hidden cameras to record couples playing as contestants. One member of the couple knows they are on the show and must convince their partner to complete a series of challenges. The series was canceled after its first season primarily due to poor ratings.

Gameplay
The series is shot with hidden cameras and features couples playing together as contestants. Only one member of the couple knows they are being filmed, and must convince their partner to complete a variety of "outrageous and comedic challenges." The couple wins a monetary prize dependent on how many challenges they complete.

Production
Hidden Agenda was first announced on December 10, 2009. Television comedian Debi Gutierrez was chosen to host the show, other actors were also employed to add "fun and excitement" to the challenges. Michael Davies' production company Embassy Row served as the series' producers. The show premiered on January 14, 2010. After seven episodes, the series was dropped from GSN's schedule and eventually canceled.

Reception
An editor for Hollywood Junket drew comparisons between the series and Ashton Kutcher's hidden camera show Game Show in My Head, which debuted on CBS a year earlier. The series' ratings were below average for GSN (CNN's James Dinan described them as "ratings woes"), falling over time, and by April, the show was absent from GSN's schedule entirely.

See also
 Game Show in My Head
 Instant Recall

References

External links
 at the Wayback Machine

2010 American television series debuts
2010 American television series endings
2010s American game shows
American hidden camera television series
Game Show Network original programming